Paul Gerber (1854 Berlin, Germany – 13 August 1909 Freiburg im Breisgau, Germany) was a German physics teacher. He studied in Berlin from 1872-1875. In 1877 he became a teacher at the Realgymnasium (high school) in Stargard in Pommern. Gerber is known for his controversial work on the speed of gravity and the perihelion shift of Mercury's orbit.

Gravitation

Basic concept
Based on the electrodynamic laws of Wilhelm Eduard Weber, Carl Friedrich Gauß, and Bernhard Riemann, between 1870-1900 many scientists tried to combine gravitation with a finite propagation speed and tried to derive the correct value for the perihelion shift of Mercury's orbit. In 1890 Maurice Lévy succeeded in doing so by combining the laws of Weber and Riemann, whereby the speed of gravity is equal to the speed of light in his theory. However, because the basic laws of Weber and others were wrong (for example, Weber's law was superseded by Maxwell's equations), those hypotheses were rejected.

A variation of those superseded theories (albeit not directly based on Weber's theory) was the one of Gerber, which he developed in 1898 and 1902. By assuming a finite speed of gravity, he developed the following expression for the gravitational potential:

Using the binomial theorem to second order it follows:

According to Gerber, the relation of the speed of gravity (c) and the perihelion shift (Ψ) is:

where
, ε = Eccentricity,  a = Semi-major axis, τ = Orbital period.
So Gerber was able to calculate a speed of gravity of ca. 305 000 km/s, slightly more than the speed of light.

Controversy
Gerber's formula gives for the perihelion shift:

It was noted by the Einstein- and relativity critic Ernst Gehrcke in 1916, that this formula is mathematically identical to Albert Einstein's formula (1915) for general relativity.
, where e = Eccentricity, a = Semi-major axis, T = Orbital period.
So Gehrcke initiated a reprint of Gerber's 1902-paper in the Annalen der Physik in 1917, where he questioned the priority of Einstein and tried to prove a possible plagiarism by him. However, according to Albrecht Fölsing, Klaus Hentschel and Roseveare, those claims were rejected, because soon after Gerber's paper was reprinted, scientists like Hugo von Seeliger, Max von Laue published some papers, where it was claimed that Gerber's theory is inconsistent and his formula is not the consequence of his premises.   And Einstein wrote in 1920:

In the recent past, Roseveare argued that Gerber's derivation is unclear, however, he claimed to have found the way by which Gerber possibly found his result (although Roseveare's derivation was criticized as well). More importantly, Roseveare showed that Gerber's theory is in conflict with experience: the value for the deflection of light in the gravitational field of the sun is too high in Gerber's theory, and if the relativistic mass is considered, also Gerber's prediction for the perihelion advance is wrong.

References

Primary sources

 (Originally published in Programmabhandlung des städtischen Realgymnasiums zu Stargard i. Pomm., 1902)

Secondary sources

 Hentschel, Klaus: „Interpretationen und Fehlinterpretationen der speziellen und der allgemeinen Relativitätstheorie durch Zeitgenossen Albert Einsteins“, Basel: Birkhäuser, 1990 (= Science Networks, 6), pp. 150–162.

Notes

External links

Scientists from Berlin
19th-century German physicists
1854 births
1909 deaths